Pseudeuclea is a genus of longhorn beetles of the subfamily Lamiinae, containing the following species:

 Pseudeuclea cribrosa Schwarzer, 1931
 Pseudeuclea roseolata Breuning, 1961

References

Pteropliini